Rashad Jules (born 24 June 1992) is a Barbadian international footballer who plays for Finnish club Kemi Kings as a midfielder.

Career
Born in Brittons Hill, Jules has played for Kick Start, FC Minyor Chicago, Barbados Defence Force, Old Road and Tulsa Athletic.

He made his international debut for Barbados in 2015.

In April 2019, Rashad joined Finnish club Kemi Kings.

International goals
Scores and results list Barbados' goal tally first.

References

1992 births
Living people
Barbadian footballers
Barbados international footballers
Barbados Defence Force SC players
Old Road F.C. players
Kemi City F.C. players
Tulsa Athletic players
Association football midfielders
Barbadian expatriate footballers
Barbadian expatriates in the United States
Expatriate soccer players in the United States
Barbadian expatriate sportspeople in Antigua and Barbuda
Expatriate footballers in Antigua and Barbuda